Psyche rassei is a moth of the Psychidae family. It was described by Sieder in 1975. It is found in Turkey.

References

 Masonia rassei in animaldiversity

External links
Lepiforum.de

Moths described in 1975
Psychidae
Insects of Turkey